Kinvara or Kinvarra is a sea port village in the southwest of County Galway, Ireland. It is located in the civil parish of Kinvarradoorus in the north of the barony of Kiltartan. Kinvarra is also an electoral division.

Geography
The village lies at the head of Kinvara Bay, known in Irish as Cinn Mhara (or more recently Cuan Cinn Mhara), an inlet in the south-eastern corner of Galway Bay, from which the village took its name. It lies in the north of the barony of Kiltartan, close to the border with The Burren in County Clare, in the province of Munster.

The townland of Kinvarra lies in the civil parish of Kinvarradoorus. This civil parish is bounded on the north by Galway Bay, on the east by the parishes of Ballinderreen (Killeenavarra) and Ardrahan, on the south by the parishes of Gort (Kilmacduagh) and Boston (Kilkeedy) and on the west by the parishes of Carron and New Quay (Abbey and Oughtmama).  It is roughly coextensive with the Ó hEidhin territory of Coill Ua bhFiachrach (wood of the Uí Fhiachrach), and this name was still in use in the mid-19th century as recorded by John O'Donovan in his Ordnance Survey letters.

History

Early history
Evidence of ancient settlement in the area include a number of promontory fort and ring fort sites in the surrounding townlands of Dungory West, Ballybranagan and Loughcurra North. There are similar sites, as well as the ruins of lime kiln and 18th century windmill, within Kinvarra townland itself.

Dunguaire Castle

A Fearadhach Ó hEidhin (Faragh O'Hynes) is recorded as the owner of the castle in a 1574 list of castles and their owners covering County Galway. This list was thought to have been compiled for the use of the Lord Deputy Sir Henry Sidney who planned the composition of Connacht.

Terry Alts
The Terry Alt agrarian resistance movement of the early 19th century was active in the Kinvara area. In 1831, a large force of Terry Alts gathered on the Galway/Clare border on Abbey Hill between Kinvara and New Quay in County Clare, and challenged the (British) army to battle. They, however, dispersed before the arrival of the soldiers. They also unsuccessfully attempted to ambush a body of infantry at Corranroo in the west of the parish, which led to the death of one of their members.

Population
The Great Famine in the 1840s, and a series of emigrations that continued until the 1960s, reduced the population of the village – once a thriving port and exporter of corn and seaweed – to no more than a few hundred people.

In the 25 years between the 1991 and 2016 census, the population of Kinvara increased by 170%, from 425 to 734 people.

Religion
In the Catholic Church, the ecclesiastical parish of Kinvara is part of the Roman Catholic Diocese of Galway, Kilmacduagh and Kilfenora. Churches within Kinvara parish include Saint Colman's Church (built 1819) and Saint Joseph's Church (built 1877).

Kinvara lies within the Church of Ireland united Diocese of Limerick and Killaloe.

Festivals

Kinvara is home every year to two festivals,  ("the cuckoo festival") an Irish music festival at the start of May and the Cruinniú na mBád ("gathering of the boats") in mid August.

Sports
Kinvara is home to Kinvara GAA, a Gaelic Athletic Association club. The club is almost exclusively concerned with hurling but also plays Gaelic football at Junior level.

Notable people
Ailbhe of Ceann Mhara, 9th century cleric.
Coman of Kinvara, early medieval saint.
Francis Fahy, composer and poet, wrote the song "Galway Bay."
Celia Lynch, politician.
P. J. Mara, public affairs consultant and senator, was buried in Kinvara.
Peter Martyn, judge.
Eoghan Ó hEidhin, died 1340, King of Uí Fiachrach Aidhne.
John Prine, American country folk singer-songwriter, had a home in Kinvara.
Mathilda Twomey, Chief Justice of the Seychelles, first female holder of that office.
Conor Whelan, hurler.
Máire Whelan, judge and 30th Attorney General of Ireland from 2011 to 2017; first woman to hold this position.

See also

 List of towns and villages in Ireland
 Island Eddy

References

Towns and villages in County Galway